Barry M. Lester is an American psychiatrist, currently a professor at Brown University. He is a Fellow of American Association for the Advancement of Science and American Psychological Association.

References

Year of birth missing (living people)
Living people
Brown University faculty
American psychiatrists
Fellows of the American Association for the Advancement of Science